Norman Peyretti (born 6 February 1994) is a French footballer who plays as a midfielder for Swiss club Vevey-Sports.

Club career
On 1 September 2021, he was loaned by Yverdon to Bellinzona.

On 9 August 2022, Peyretti signed with Vevey-Sports.

References

1994 births
Footballers from Nice
Living people
French footballers
Association football midfielders
FC Biel-Bienne players
FC Thun players
FC Aarau players
Yverdon-Sport FC players
AC Bellinzona players
FC Vevey United players
Swiss Super League players
Swiss Challenge League players
Swiss Promotion League players
Swiss 1. Liga (football) players
2. Liga Interregional players
French expatriate footballers
Expatriate footballers in Switzerland
French expatriate sportspeople in Switzerland